The Rolls-Royce Gem is a turboshaft engine developed specifically for the Westland Lynx helicopter in the 1970s. The design started off at de Havilland (hence the name starting with "G") and was passed to Bristol Siddeley as the BS.360. When Rolls-Royce bought out the latter in 1966, it became the RS.360.

Design and development
The Gem's three-shaft engine configuration is rather unusual for turboshaft/turboprop engines. Basic arrangement is a four-stage axial LP (Low Pressure) compressor, driven by a single stage LP turbine, supercharging a centrifugal HP (High Pressure) compressor, driven by a single stage HP turbine. Power is delivered to the load via a third shaft, connected to a two-stage free (power) turbine. A reverse flow combustor is featured.

Until recently all versions of the Lynx have been Gem powered. However, now that Rolls-Royce own Allison, they have been marketing the more modern LHTEC T800, developed jointly with Honeywell.

Applications
Agusta A129 Mangusta
Westland Lynx

Engines on display
East Midlands Aeropark
Midland Air Museum
The Helicopter Museum (Weston)
111 (Sunderland) Squadron ATC
 South Yorkshire Aircraft Museum

Specifications (Gem 42)

See also

References

Notes

Bibliography

 Gunston, Bill. World Encyclopedia of Aero Engines. Cambridge, England. Patrick Stephens Limited, 1989.

External links

Rolls-Royce Gem product page
"Rolls-Royce/Turbomeca BS.360" a 1972 Flight article

1970s turboshaft engines
Gem
Gem
Mixed-compressor gas turbines